Frederick Marginson Collinson (1874 – 15 May 1915) was an English football outside left who played in the Football League for Darwen and Bury.

Personal life 
Collinson joined the Lancashire Fusiliers of the British Army at age 15 in 1889 and stated his age was 18. He was transferred to the reserve in 1895, but was recalled to rejoin the Fusiliers in November 1899 and saw action at Spion Kop and Ladysmith during the Second Boer War. Collinson was honourably discharged in April 1902 and by 1911, he was married with two children and working as a gas meter inspector. He re-enlisted in the Lancashire Fusiliers in Bury during the early months of the First World War and was sent to Gallipoli with his battalion in May 1915. Two days after his arrival, Collinson was wounded in action by rounds from an Ottoman heavy machine gun. A second lieutenant wrote of his wounding:

Collinson died of his wound on 15 May 1915, seven days after he received it. He has no known grave and is commemorated on the Helles Memorial.

References

1874 births
1915 deaths
Footballers from Bolton
English footballers
English Football League players
Everton F.C. players
Bury F.C. players
British Army personnel of World War I
Lancashire Fusiliers soldiers
British military personnel killed in World War I
British Army personnel of the Second Boer War
Darwen F.C. players
Blackburn Rovers F.C. players
Association football outside forwards
Association football wing halves
Chorley F.C. players